The 1980 San Jose Earthquakes season was the franchise's seventh in the North American Soccer League.  They finished fourth in
the Western Division of the American Conference.

Squad
The 1980 squad

Competitions

NASL

Match results

Season 

* = ShootoutSource:

Standings

American Conference

References

External links
The Year in American Soccer – 1980 | NASL
San Jose Earthquakes Game Results | Soccerstats.us
San Jose Earthquakes Rosters | nasljerseys.com

San Jose Earthquakes seasons
San Jose
San Jose
1980 in sports in California